Barren Cross is an American Christian metal band that was formed in Los Angeles in 1983 by high school friends Ray Parris (guitar) and Steve Whitaker (drums). The band released six albums from 1986 to 1994. They have reunited for a few shows in recent years, and plan to record a new album.

By 1984, bassist Jim LaVerde and vocalist Michael Drive (originally Mike Lee) were added. In 1989, the band appeared on The Morton Downey Show alongside members of KISS and Anthrax. In 1990, Mike Lee left and joined the band Bare Bones but would appear on the Barren Cross' later releases.

Music
Musically, Barren Cross is often compared to Iron Maiden, mainly due to the similarity of the vocals between Mike Lee and Maiden frontman Bruce Dickinson. Lyrically, the band is noted for its stance on a number of social issues. Their songs addressed, from a Christian worldview, personal and societal issues such as suicide, abortion, terrorism, and prejudice. In 1985, they contributed to the Last Days Ministries' anti-abortion song Fight the Fight.

Biography
Over the years, Barren Cross has seen their share of successes since their start out of high school in 1982. In 1985, their first EP, Believe, an independent release, garnered national attention and trademarked their raw metal sound. The following year, Star Song Records released their first full-length album, Rock for the King. 1988 saw a second full-length release, Atomic Arena, this time on Enigma Records (now Capitol Records) alongside label mates Poison, Ratt, Slayer, Stryper, and others.

In 1989, as a follow-up to their Enigma debut, they released State of Control, and Hotter than Hell Live!, a full production live album on Medusa Records, was released the following year (1990). A few months later, Rock for the King was reissued and has since become a collector's item. Subsequent to lead singer Michael Lee (now known as Michael Drive) pursuing another project (becoming writer and lead vocalist for the band Bare Bones), vocalist Vincent Van Voltenburg, aka, Vin Van Volt, of the Christian Metal quartet, Full Armor, was introduced as the new lead singer and took the reins for all live performances during the 1990 "State of Control World Tour" which included sold-out shows in Ireland, Germany, Austria and the U.S. Soon after the 1990 World Tour ended, the new lineup with Ray Parris on (Guitar), Jim LaVerde (Bass), Vin Van Volt (vocals) and David LaVai (drums), was to begin writing for the next record which might have included a Vin Van Volt song called "Pain Reliever". The song, a new sound for Barren Cross, was well received by audiences on the State of Control tour. The record with this new lineup would never materialize, and Barren Cross went on hiatus until their last full-length release (to date), the stylistically evolved Rattle Your Cage, released on Rugged Records in 1994. "Rattle Your Cage" featured all of the original members of Barren Cross.

Barren Cross earned some airplay on VH1, MTV, radio stations, and several label and metal music compilations. For over twenty years, international music magazines have featured the band consistently. Besides six major label releases, five of them full-length, Barren Cross was known for relentless touring.

Reunion
On May 8, 2008, the band officially announced they would be returning to the music scene, launching MySpace and Facebook pages for the band and remaining active in communication.  The band initially announced a reunion which included original lead singer, Mike Lee, but would eventually announce experienced singer, Dean Kohn, would be fulfilling vocal duties. A successful short-term reunion with a few international reunion concerts ensued, with announcements of a return to the recording studio with new music. In 2010, Barren Cross announced a special re-release of their debut album, Believe EP, marking the 25-year anniversary of its original 1985 independent release. Mike Lee has since appeared on Barren Cross' most recent live performances. In 2013 Barren Cross released a live album Birth Pangs, which is a recording of their performance at Elements of Rock the previous year.

Band members 
Michael "Mike Lee" Drive – lead vocals, acoustic guitar, keyboards
Jim LaVerde – bass guitars, keyboards, synthesizer, piano, backing vocals
Ray Parris – guitars, backing vocals
Steve Whittaker – drums, backing vocals

Discography
1985: Believe EP (Independent) (Produced by Dino & John Elefante)
1986: Rock for the King (Star Song)
1988: Atomic Arena (Enigma Records)
1989: State of Control (Enigma Records)
1990: Hotter Than Hell Live! live album (Restless)
1990: Rock for the King re-issue (Medusa Records)
1994: Rattle Your Cage (Rugged Records)
1996: Atomic Arena re-issue (Victor Entertainment, Japan)
2004: Rattle Your Cage re-issue (Girder Records)
2007: Paid in Blood – The Very Best of Barren Cross compilation (Independent)
2013: Birth Pangs – Thirtieth Anniversary – Live from Elements of Rock, Switzerland

See also
List of Christian metal artists
List of glam metal bands and artists

References

External links
 

American Christian metal musical groups
Glam metal musical groups from California
Christian rock groups from California
Heavy metal musical groups from California
Musical groups established in 1983
1983 establishments in California
Restless Records artists